Ribbon work is an appliqué technique for clothing and dance regalia among Prairie and Great Lakes Native American tribes. Deb Haaland wore a ribbon skirt made by Agnes Woodward for her 2021 swearing in ceremony as US Interior Secretary.

History
Silk ribbons, brought to North America by European traders, inspired a new, uniquely Native American art form. Mi'kmaq people created ribbon appliqué as early as 1611. In 1789 the regime of the French Revolution decreed that clothing should be plain, so silk ribbons fell out of fashion in France and were exported to North America. Those tribes who traded furs with the French are most known for their ribbon work, such as the Kickapoo, Mesquakie, Miami, Odawa, Ojibwa, Osage, Otoe-Missouria, Potawatomi, and Quapaw, but the practice has spread to many other tribes. Initially, layers of ribbons were sewn on the edges of cloth, replacing painted lines on hide clothing and blankets. By the close of the 18th century, Native seamstresses created much more intricate appliqué ribbon work designs.

Description
The ribbons are layered on top of each other with pieces cut out to create optically active designs from both positive and negative space. The ribbons' edges are sewn with needles and cotton thread – later, with nylon thread. Designs and colors may be significant to particular clans within the tribes. Specific patterns are passed from mother to daughters within families. Design elements can include floral designs, diamonds, stepped diamonds, crescents, hearts, circles, and double-curves.

Today ribbon work can be seen on dance regalia at tribal ceremonies and powwows. Ribbon work is applied to both men's and women's clothing and is incorporated into leggings, skirts, blankets, shawls, breechclouts, purses, shirts, vests, pillows, and other cloth items.

National Ribbon Skirt Day

In Canada under an Act of Parliament from 2023, the National Ribbon Skirt Day is held on 4 January.  Its basis was when a student was told it was not 'formal wear' for school.

See also
Dush-toh, Caddo women's ribbon headdress

References

External links
 Ribbon work tutorial on Powwows.com
 Native American Ribbon Designs

Great Lakes tribal culture
Indigenous culture of the Great Plains
Indigenous culture of the Northeastern Woodlands
Native American clothing
Indigenous textile art of the Americas